The Pratt School of Engineering is located at Duke University in the United States. The school's associated research, education, alumni and service-to-society efforts are collectively known as Duke Engineering.

Research expenditures at Duke Engineering exceed $88 million per year. Its faculty is highly ranked in overall research productivity among U.S. engineering schools by Academic Analytics. More than 30 Duke alumni and faculty have been elected to the prestigious National Academy of Engineering since its founding in 1964.

The Pratt School of Engineering also maintains these academic departments:
 Biomedical Engineering
 Civil & Environmental Engineering
 Electrical & Computer Engineering
 Thomas Lord Department of Mechanical Engineering & Materials Science

The school was created by Duke's Board of Trustees in 1939. It was named in 1999 following a $35 million gift by Edmund T. Pratt Jr., a 1947 graduate and former chief executive of Pfizer. The Duke University Pratt School of Engineering celebrated its 75th anniversary in 2014–2015.

Education

Undergraduate

Majors
Duke awards the Bachelor of Science in Engineering (BSE) and offers five ABET-accredited engineering majors and independent interdisciplinary options: 
 Biomedical Engineering
 Civil Engineering
 Environmental Engineering
 Electrical & Computer Engineering
 Mechanical Engineering
 Interdisciplinary Options (IDEAS)

Minors
Engineering minors offered at Duke include:
 Machine Learning & Artificial Intelligence (AI)
 Electrical & Computer Engineering
 Energy Engineering

Certificates
Undergraduate engineering certificates offered by Duke include:
 Architectural Engineering
 Aerospace Engineering
 Energy & the Environment
 Global Development Engineering
 Materials Science & Engineering

Master's Degrees
Duke awards master's degrees in:

 Biomedical Engineering
 Civil & Environmental Engineering
 Electrical & Computer Engineering
 Mechanical Engineering & Materials Science
 Artificial Intelligence for Product Innovation
 Cybersecurity
 Engineering Management
 Financial Technology (FinTech)
 Materials Science & Engineering

Federal Deposit Insurance Corporation (FDIC) and Duke’s Pratt School of Engineering entered into partnership to support technological innovation in the banking and financial services sectors. According to Jimmie Lenz, director of Duke’s Master of Engineering programs in FinTech and Cybersecurity, “...This partnership highlights the dramatic changes taking place in finance, and recognition by the FDIC of the key role Duke Engineering is playing in this dynamic environment.”

Doctorate
Duke's Pratt School of Engineering awards PhDs in:
 Biomedical Engineering
 Civil & Environmental Engineering
 Electrical & Computer Engineering
 Mechanical Engineering & Materials Science

With Duke's School of Medicine, Duke's Department of Biomedical Engineering offers a dual MD-Master of Engineering degree program. Also, medical students in Duke's MD/PhD Medical Science Training Program, can earn a doctorate in an engineering discipline in partnership with Duke's Pratt School of Engineering.

Doctoral Certificate Programs
 Biomolecular & Tissue Engineering
 Nanoscience
 Photonics

Professional Education/Graduate Certificates
Standalone graduate-level certificates, intended for working professionals, are granted in:
 AI Foundations for Product Innovation
 Business Foundations for Engineers

Research and Innovation
Duke Engineering faculty research is grouped into four signature themes:
 Data Science, Advanced Computing and Intelligent Systems
 Materials Discovery and Development
 Personal, Environmental & Population Health
 Resilient Systems and the Environment

Faculty Research
The school's faculty research laboratories have played major roles in the development of many high-impact technologies, including:

 Real-time ultrasound imaging in clinical practice (1976)
 Continuous interleaved sampling strategy for cochlear implants (1991)
 First working "invisibility cloak" using metamaterials (2006)
 World's first gigapixel camera (2012)

Student Research
More than 62 percent of all Duke engineering undergraduates report having participated in some way in research in a faculty research lab.

Since July 2018, Duke engineering students have held the Guinness World Record for inventing the world's most fuel-efficient vehicle—powered by a fuel cell, it achieved 14,573 miles per gallon equivalent. In 2019, Duke Engineering students earned a second Guinness World Record for the world's most efficient all-electric vehicle—797 miles per kilowatt-hour.

Leadership

Former Deans
 William H. Hall, 1939-1953
 Walter J. Seeley, 1953-1962
 James L. Meriam, 1962-1969
 George Pearsall, 1969-1974, 1982-1983
 Aleksandar Vesic, 1974-1982
 Earl H. Dowell, 1983-1999
 Kristina M. Johnson, 1999-2007
 Robert L. Clark, 2007-2008
 Thomas C. Katsouleas, 2008–2015
 George Truskey, 2015-2016
 Ravi V. Bellamkonda, 2016-2021
 Jeffrey T. Glass, 2021

History 
The precursor to the school of engineering dates back to 1851, when Duke was known as Normal College and located in Randolph County, North Carolina.  At that time, engineering was included in a classical course for seniors.  A course in engineering was introduced in 1887, eventually becoming a regular course offering in 1903. 
'
At that time, engineering courses were limited to such fields as architecture and surveying until 1924, when Trinity College was renamed Duke University. Engineering was taught in the new separate departments of civil and electrical engineering.  In 1931, a mechanical engineering department was created. Duke's Board of Trustees created the College of Engineering in 1939, with William H. Hall its first dean.

The College of Engineering graduated its first female graduates in 1946.  The next year, the three departments moved from East Campus to West Campus.  It became the Duke School of Engineering in 1966.  Two years later the school's first black students graduated. The Division of Biomedical Engineering was created in 1967 — the first accredited biomedical engineering department at a U.S. university — in September 1972.

In 1997, the Master of Engineering Management was established.

The school was renamed the Edmund T. Pratt Jr. School of Engineering in 1999, in honor of the 1947 graduate and former CEO of Pfizer.

Facilities

Duke Engineering occupies more than 300,000 net square feet of educational, administrative and research space on and near the Duke campus in Durham, North Carolina.

The Duke Engineering campus is adjacent to Duke University Medical Center and 10 miles from Research Triangle Park.

Pratt's faculty, labs, and courses can be found in Hudson Hall, the Nello L. Teer Engineering Building, the Fitzpatrick Center for Interdisciplinary Engineering, Medicine and Applied Sciences (also known as FCIEMAS), Gross Hall, the North Building, the Levine Science Research Center (also known as the LSRC) and in The Chesterfield, a former cigarette factory near downtown Durham that has been redeveloped into academic and industry research space.

Wilkinson Building
This 150,000-square-foot building opened for classes in early 2021 with new spaces for education and research related to interdisciplinary themes of improving human health, advancing computing and intelligent systems, and sustainability.

The Wilkinson Building, located at Research Drive and Telcom Drive next to Bostock Library, also houses Duke Engineering's entrepreneurship initiatives.

The building's name recognizes lifetime philanthropic and service contributions of Duke Engineering alumnus Jerry C. Wilkinson and family.

Fitzpatrick Center
The Fitzpatrick Center for Interdisciplinary Engineering, Medicine and Applied Sciences (FCIEMAS) opened in August 2004. Research facilities focus on the fields of photonics, bioengineering, communications, and materials science and materials engineering.  The aim of the building was to emphasize interdisciplinary activities and encourage cross-departmental interactions.  The building houses numerous wet bench laboratories (highlighted by a world-class nanotechnology research wing), offices, teaching spaces, and a café. FCIEMAS is also home to the Master of Engineering Management Program offices. The construction of FCIEMAS took more than three years and cost more than $97 million.

Levine Science Research Center
The Levine Science Research Center (LSRC) is a  facility.  When it was opened in 1994, the LSRC was the largest single-site interdisciplinary research facility in the U.S.  Its classrooms are shared by several departments, but the majority of its offices and laboratories are utilized by the Nicholas School of the Environment, the Pratt School of Engineering, the Center for Cognitive Neuroscience and Developmental and the departments of Computer Science, Pharmacology and Cancer Biology and Cell and Molecular Biology.  The building was named for Leon Levine, the CEO of Family Dollar Stores.

Hudson Hall
Hudson Hall is the oldest engineering building at Duke, constructed in 1948. It was renamed to honor Fitzgerald S. "Jerry" Hudson (E'46) in 1992.

Nello L. Teer Building
The Nello L. Teer Library Building opened in 1984. Located adjacent to Hudson Hall, it is now called the Nello L. Teer Building, and houses the Dean's offices, a computing lab, a circuits lab, an auditorium and a student lounge. The building's name honors Teer, its donor and a Durham, North Carolina-based builder and philanthropist.

Notable alumni

 M. Katherine Banks—Phytoremediation of petroleum contamination
 Robert E. Fischell—Leadership and innovation in bringing aerospace technology to implantable medical devices
 William A. Hawkins III—Leadership in biomedical engineering and translational medicine
 Blake S. Wilson—Engineering development of the cochlear implant
 Kathryn R. Nightingale— Invention of Ultrasound Acoustic Radiation Force Imaging

Notes

External links 

Pratt School of Engineering
Engineering schools and colleges in the United States
Engineering universities and colleges in North Carolina
Educational institutions established in 1939
1939 establishments in North Carolina